Heavy Mental is the debut album by rapper Killah Priest, an associate of hip-hop group Wu-Tang Clan and a member of the group Sunz of Man. It was released on March 10, 1998, on Geffen Records.

The album is resplendent with references to Judeo-Christian-Islamic mythology and theology, drawing parallels to the condition of Black people in the United States to that of the Jewish people during Exodus. A notable track on the CD is B.I.B.L.E. (Basic Instructions Before Leaving Earth), which had already appeared on GZA's 1995 Liquid Swords album in a slightly different form. Another is the title track, which features Killah Priest rhyming in a style reminiscent of slam poetry and prominently features a didgeridoo. “One Step,” with its refrain of “Your arms too short to box with God,” reached #84 on the Billboard Hot R&B/Hip Hop singles chart. Priest released the album through Geffen/MCA Records, which already had a relationship with Wu-Tang Clan. The album peaked at 24 on the Billboard top-200 and at 4 in the Top R&B/Hip Hop charts.

Track listing

Track listing information is taken from the official liner notes and AllMusic.

Notes
 "Mystic City" features uncredited vocals by Shangai the Messenger.
 "The Professional" is only found on CD versions of the album.

Samples
 "From Then Till Now" contains a sample of "Diamonds Are Forever", written by D. Black/J. Barry and performed by London Starlight Orchestra, and a sample of "The Man In The Raincoat", written by W. Warwick and performed by Marion Marlow.
 "Fake MC's" contains a sample of "My Little Brown Book", written by B. Strayhorn and performed by John Coltrane & Duke Ellington.
 "Atoms to Adam" contains a sample of "Sweet Pain", written by M. Brook/Ali Khan and performed by Nusrat Fateh Ali Kahn, and dialogue from the speech "Blue Eyed Devil" by Malcolm X.
 "Information" contains a sample of "All The Kings Horses", written by A. Franklin and performed by Grover Washington, Jr.

Album singles

References

Killah Priest albums
1998 debut albums
Geffen Records albums
Albums produced by True Master
Albums produced by 4th Disciple